Gloria Ouida Lee or Siew Yoke Kwan (née Hong), also known as Gloria Purdy-Lee (14 July 1908 – 13 April 1995) was a Chinese-Australian miner. She was the daughter of Alice Springs Chinese Market gardener Ah Hong and his indigenous Western Arrernte wife Ranjika. Lee travelled between Australia and China and experienced discrimination because of her mixed parentage. She is included in the archive collection of the Women's Museum of Australia, formerly known as the National Pioneer Women's Hall of Fame. Her oral history is held at the National Library of Australia.

Early life 

Lee was born in a creek under a tree, in Stuart (what would become Alice Springs), Australia, in 1908, the youngest child of Ah Hong and Ranjika. Lee's family ran a market garden on Todd Street and their house was popular with bush men needing a "good feed" when they came to town.

As a child the government attempted to take Lee and her siblings Ada and Dempsey, to live at The Bungalow, and institution for Aboriginal children. Her father protected them from being taken from him by threatening to shoot the policeman who was sent to take the children. Lee would later attend school at The Bungalow, where she was taught by Ida Standley, during the day, but was not required to live there.

Ranjika died in childbirth in 1914 and in 1918 Ah Hong sold his market garden and took his three children to China, to be cared for by relatives. It was a yearlong journey; the family had to first travel to Darwin by horse and buggy before taking a ship. In China she was welcomed by her father's family who, although aware her mother was Aboriginal, welcomed her with open arms and was respectful towards her. Her father spent a year in China with Lee and her siblings, and then returned to Alice Springs alone in 1920. While Lee lived in China, she went to school, learning to read and write in Cantonese, until she was 15 or 16 years old. Following the completion of her schooling, she assisted her family in the home, as was expected at the time.

Life in Alice Springs 

Lee decided to return to Alice Springs in 1929. Lee was the first Aboriginal woman in Alice Springs to own a house. She purchased the land herself with her earnings from mining and hospital work, and she managed and supervised the construction of her house herself. She struggled to fit in with Aboriginal people who considered her Chinese while Chinese people viewed her as Aboriginal. 

Lee became pregnant with the child of Englishman Fred 'Lofty' Purdy; she was rejected by her father for not marrying a Chinese man. Lee and Purdy married at the Catholic Church in Alice Springs and lived in a simple house, with dirt floors, near her father's market garden which was now located on Gap Road. They are also recorded as mining together at Hatches Creek for wolframite. 

She was known as a hard-working woman miner who was also a well-educated avid reader of history, politics and culture. During her lifetime she was outspoken about social issues, and often wrote letters to the editor of the local newspapers. 

Lee and Purdy had four daughters together in the 1930s - 1940s: Valencia, Olive, Peg and Joyce, all of whom all attended school at Our Lady of Sacred Heart Convent School.

When her father died in 1952, she was his only surviving child. In 1953, after the breakup of her marriage, Lee moved to Brisbane where she eventually married William Lee, a Chinese man who she later divorced from.  

Following her death in 1995, Lee was buried in Alice Springs.

Legacy 

The Gloria Lee Ngale Environmental Learning Centre in Alice Springs was named for Lee by her daughter Olive Veverbrants. The purpose of the centre is to provide indigenous people with the knowledge and technologies for creating sustainable food production and healthy lifestyles. The centre was built using sustainable architectural design practices. It is powered completely on solar energy, uses composting toilets, and a grey water system for watering the food gardens.

Many of Lee's descendants live in around the Northern Territory and Alice Springs. Lee is the grandmother of Olga Havnen, an Aboriginal activist and leader. Havnen cites her grandmother as an inspiration for her advocacy.

Oral history 

Lee's oral history was tape-recorded as part of a project for the National Library of Australia documenting the lives of Chinese Australians. The oral history was published in the form of an interview in the book, Astronauts, Lost Souls & Dragons: Voices of Today's Chinese Australians (Diana Giese, University of Queensland Press, 1997)

References

External links 
 Gloria Purdy-Lee on Billion Graves

People from Alice Springs
1908 births
1995 deaths
Australian expatriates in China